Stanislav Feikl (12 November 1883, Dolní Sytová, Semily District – 7 January 1933, Prague) was a Czech painter.

He studied at the School of Applied Arts and at the Prague Academy of Fine Arts. For inspiration, he toured Russia, Turkey, Dalmatia and northern Italy. He is known for his pictures of old Prague, rural areas and portraits of women, including naked. He painted impressionist paintings.

His older brother was also a painter, but was less successful and died in 1910.

See also
List of Czech painters

References

External links

 Artnet: More works by Feikl

1883 births
1933 deaths
Academy of Fine Arts, Prague alumni
Landscape painters
People from Semily District
20th-century Czech painters
Czech male painters
20th-century Czech male artists
Czechoslovak painters